Casatelli Peak is a peak  east of Pritchard Peak in the Ravens Mountains, Britannia Range. It was named after Chief Master Sergeant Michael F. Casatelli who served with the 109th Airlift Wing as Medical Administration Supervisor during the transition of LC-130 operations from the U.S. Navy to the Air National Guard.

References 

Mountains of Oates Land